Judith of Thuringia (– 9 September after 1174), a member of the Ludovingian dynasty, was Queen consort of Bohemia from 1158 until 1172 as the second wife of King Vladislaus II. She was the second Queen of Bohemia after Świętosława of Poland, wife of King Vratislaus II, had received the title in 1085.

Marriage
Judith was the daughter of Landgrave Louis I of Thuringia (d. 1140) and his wife Hedwig of Gudensberg. She was raised at the Thuringian court at Wartburg Castle. In 1153 she was married to Duke Vladislaus II of Bohemia, three years after the death of his first wife Gertrude of Babenberg. The main reason for the marriage was that Judith, by her brother Landgrave Louis II and his wife Judith of Hohenstaufen, was related to the new German King Frederick Barbarossa. Vladislaus' bride was about eighteen years old; he was 15–20 years her senior.

Probably in 1155, two years after the wedding, Judith gave birth to the first son. In medieval times the names for
babies were chosen mostly by mothers, so it was probably Judith's idea to name the son Přemysl after the legendary founder of the Přemyslid dynasty.

Queen Judith

A chronicler wrote about Judith that she was of great beauty and mind, educated in Latin and politics. It is said that she often deputized for Vladislaus in his absence. When he obtained the royal title from Emperor Frederick and was crowned King of Bohemia in 1158, Judith became Queen consort. Her coronation is not actually documented, but chronicles write about Queen Judith.

During Vladislaus' rule a new bridge across the Vltava river in Prague was built from about 1160, where the famous Charles Bridge stands today. It was the first stone bridge in central Europe and in honour of the queen it was called Judith Bridge. Drawn away by a 1342 flood, remnants of some pillars and arches are still visible, as well as the preserved bridge tower (Juditina věž) on the Malá Strana bank.

In the ongoing struggle around the Prague throne, Judith backed the inheritance claims of her son Přemysl Ottokar, however, Duke Vladislaus named his stepbrother Frederick his successor. When her husband finally abdicated in 1172, his wife followed him to exile in Thuringia. Vladislaus died two years later at Meerane Castle. 

It is not known where Judith died, but her remains were found in the former Benedictine monastery of Teplice, which she had founded about 1160. According to the historian Emanuel Vlček she died about 1210 at the age of 75, living to see the successful reign of her eldest son Přemysl.

Children
Ottokar ( – 1230), Duke of Bohemia in 1192/93 and again from 1197, became King of Bohemia in 1198, first of a hereditary line
Vladislaus III ( –  1222), Duke of Bohemia in 1197, Margrave of Moravia from 1197 until his death
Richeza (d. 1182), married to Henry of Mödling, a younger son of Duke Henry II of Austria.

Literature
KAREŠOVÁ, Z.; PRAŽÁK, J. Královny a kněžny české. 1. vyd. Praha : X-Egem, 1996.
VLČEK, E. Judita Durynská– paní znamenité krásy a ducha neobyčejného. O čem vypovídá lebka manželky krále Vladislava II. Vesmír 81, říjen 2002.
M. Skopal. K otázce řezenské korunovace Vladislava II. "Acta Universitatis Carolinae. Philosophica et Historica", T. 2: Studia Historica, t. 31: 1987, s. 31–39, ad rem: s. 36–37.
A. Merhautová-Livorová. Reliéf na věži bývalého Juditina mostu. "Uméní", R. 19: 1971, nr 1, s. 70–75.

References

Bohemian queens consort
Thuringian nobility
Ludovingians
12th-century Bohemian people
12th-century Bohemian women
Daughters of monarchs